The San Marino national basketball team is the national representative for San Marino in international basketball. They are controlled by the San Marino Basketball Federation (FSP). 

The national team competes at lower tiered tournaments, being the European Championship for Small Countries, and the Games of the Small States of Europe.

Competitive record

At the Championship for Small Countries

At the Games of the Small States of Europe

See also
Sport in San Marino

References

External links
Official website 
San Marino at FIBA site
San Marino National Team - Men at Eurobasket.com

Men's national basketball teams
Basketball
National